Proscopiinae is a subfamily of grasshoppers in the family Proscopiidae. There are more than 20 genera and 190 described species, found in South America.

Tribes and Genera
Two tribes have been identified, with the following genera assigned to the subfamily Proscopiinae:

Proscopiini 

 Albascopia Cadena-Castañeda & Cardona, 2015
 Apioscelis Brunner von Wattenwyl, 1890
 Carbonellis Bentos-Pereira, 2006
 Milenascopia Queiroz & Rafael, 2019
 Paraproscopia Bentos-Pereira, 2006
 Prosarthria Brunner von Wattenwyl, 1890
 Proscopia Klug, 1820
 Pseudoproscopia Bentos-Pereira, 2006

Tetanorhynchini 

 Cephalocoema Serville, 1838
 Mariascopia Bentos-Pereira, 2003
 Orienscopia Bentos-Pereira, 2000
 Pseudastroma Jago, 1990
 Scleratoscopia Jago, 1990
 Tetanorhynchus Brunner von Wattenwyl, 1890
 Wattenwylscopia Cadena-Castañeda & Cardona, 2015

Tribe not determined 

 Anchocoema Mello-Leitão, 1939
 Anchotatus Brunner von Wattenwyl, 1890
 Astromoides Tapia, 1981
 Callangania Liana, 1980
 Carphoproscopia Jago, 1990
 Corynorhynchus Brunner von Wattenwyl, 1890
 Epigrypa Brunner von Wattenwyl, 1890
 Microcoema Jago, 1990
 Pseudoanchotatus Liana, 1980
 Stiphra Brunner von Wattenwyl, 1890

References

Further reading

 

Caelifera
Proscopiidae
Orthoptera subfamilies